Ondřej Kratěna (born 21 April 1977) is a Czech former ice hockey forward who last played for HC Plzeň in the Czech Extraliga.

Kratěna began his career with HC Olomouc where he played for two seasons. After an impressive second season where he posted eleven goals and eleven assists, he signed with HC Vsetín. After three championship winning seasons he moved to Sparta Prague and remained at the team for eight seasons, winning four more Czech titles. In 2007, he moved to Finland's SM-liiga for Oulun Kärpät and won the regular season championship and the SM-liiga playoffs championship. In 2008, Kratěna returned to Sparta Prague.

Career statistics

External links

1977 births
Czech ice hockey right wingers
HC Olomouc players
HC Plzeň players
HC Sparta Praha players
VHK Vsetín players
Oulun Kärpät players
Living people
Sportspeople from the Moravian-Silesian Region
Czech expatriate ice hockey players in Finland